Little New York may refer to:  

 Little New York, Alabama
 Little York, California, formerly called Little New York
 Staten Island (film), a 2009 film also titled Little New York